Richard N. Ochoa Quintero (February 14, 1984 – July 19, 2015) was a Venezuelan professional track and road racing cyclist.

He was killed after being hit by a motorcycle during a training ride.

Major results

2004
 Pan American Track Championships
1st  Points race
2nd  Team pursuit
2005
 1st  Overall Vuelta al Estado Portugesa
1st Stage 2b
 8th Overall Vuelta a Venezuela
2006
 1st  Points race, Central American and Caribbean Games
 1st  Overall Vuelta a la Independencia Nacional
1st Stages 3 & 7a
 1st  Overall Vuelta a Yacambu-Lara
1st Stage 2a
 2nd Clasico Ciudad de Valenci
2007
 2nd  Team pursuit, Pan American Track Championships
 2nd Overall Vuelta a Venezuela
 Pan American Games
3rd  Madison
3rd  Team pursuit
2008
 1st Stage 7 Vuelta a Venezuela
 4th Overall Vuelta Independencia Nacional
2009
 1st Stage 4 Vuelta a Lara
 3rd Time trial, National Road Championships
2010
 Central American and Caribbean Games
1st  Scratch
2nd  Points race
2011
 National Road Championships
3rd Road race
3rd Time trial
2012
 National Track Championships
1st  Madison (with Maximo Rojas)
1st  Points race
1st  Team pursuit (with Manuel Briceño, Randall Figueroa and Isaac Yaguaro)
2nd Scratch
2013
 1st  Madison, National Track Championships (with Manuel Briceño)

References

External links
 

1984 births
2015 deaths
Venezuelan male cyclists
Venezuelan track cyclists
Cyclists at the 2007 Pan American Games
Vuelta a Venezuela stage winners
People from Valencia, Venezuela
Pan American Games bronze medalists for Venezuela
Pan American Games medalists in cycling
Central American and Caribbean Games gold medalists for Venezuela
Central American and Caribbean Games silver medalists for Venezuela
Competitors at the 2006 Central American and Caribbean Games
Competitors at the 2010 Central American and Caribbean Games
Central American and Caribbean Games medalists in cycling
Medalists at the 2007 Pan American Games
21st-century Venezuelan people